Bremsnes is a village in Averøy Municipality in Møre og Romsdal county, Norway.  The village is located on the northeastern part of the island of Averøya, about midway between the villages of Sveggen (to the north) and Bruhagen (to the south).  The village sits along the Norwegian County Road 64 which goes through the Atlantic Ocean Tunnel just north of Bremsnes.  That tunnel connects Averøya to the city of Kristiansund to the east.  

Bremsnes Church is located in this village.  The old Bremsnes Municipality existed from 1897 until 1964, and it had its municipal government based here in Bremsnes village.

References

Villages in Møre og Romsdal
Averøy